Tri-Eastern Conference titles during the fall season.

Boys' TEC Cross Country Titles

Boys' Sectional Cross Country Titles

Boys' Regional Cross Country Titles

Girls' TEC Cross Country Titles

Girls' Sectional Cross Country Titles

Girls' Regional Cross Country Titles

Football TEC Titles 

 Liberty did not have football, and Short started their team in 1968.

Football Sectional Titles

Football Regional, Semi-State, State Titles

Boys' TEC Tennis Titles

Boys' Sectional Tennis Titles

Boys' Regional, Semi-State, State Tennis Titles

Girls' TEC Golf Titles

Girls' Golf Sectional Titles

Girls' TEC Volleyball Titles

Girls' Sectional Volleyball Titles

Girls' Regional, Semi-State, State Volleyball Titles

References

Sources 
T.E.C. Boys Champions
T.E.C. Girls Champions

High school sports conferences and leagues in the United States
Indiana High School Athletic Association